Richmond Gas Company Building was a historic commercial building located at Richmond, Wayne County, Indiana.  It was built in 1855, and was a two-story, "L"-shaped, early Victorian style brick building.  It had a gable roof supported by steel trusses and round and arched windows.

It was listed on the National Register of Historic Places in 1981 and delisted in 2012.

References

External links

Historic American Engineering Record in Indiana
Commercial buildings on the National Register of Historic Places in Indiana
Victorian architecture in Indiana
Commercial buildings completed in 1855
Buildings and structures in Richmond, Indiana
National Register of Historic Places in Wayne County, Indiana